Lloyd Arthur Eshbach (June 20, 1910 – October 29, 2003) was an American science fiction fan, publisher and writer, secular and religious publisher, and minister.

Biography 

Born in Palm, Pennsylvania, Eshbach grew up in Reading in the same state. He discovered science fiction at age 15 and began writing letters to the professional magazines, then started to write his own stories. The third story he wrote sold to Science Wonder Stories in 1929. In the early 1930s, while still writing his own stories and articles, he published a fanzine,The Galleon, and helped William Crawford launch his semiprofessional magazines Marvel Tales and Unusual Stories. He initiated Fantasy Press, a small press which published the work of authors such as E. E. Smith, Jack Williamson, Robert A. Heinlein and John W. Campbell, Jr. Fantasy Press published a total of 46 titles in its lifetime, with two additional fantasy titles published under the subsidiary imprint, Polaris Press. Fantasy Press books were produced in limited print runs averaging 3,750 copies each, with between 250 and 500 copies of each title bearing a limited plate inserted after the title page that was numbered and autographed by the book's author. These constituted the first hardcover editions of many of these works, previously available only in used copies of magazines.

Eshbach was a church publisher from 1958 to 1962, then he was a salesman for the Moody Bible Institute until retirement in 1975. Upon his retirement, he became a pastor in the Evangelical Congregational Church and served churches of that denomination in Pennsylvania in Lancaster County, Reading, and Womelsdorf.

Eshbach was a lifelong science fiction fan, and besides creating Fantasy Press he was instrumental in assisting others in the creation and operation of their own fan or specialty presses, including William Crawford of Fantasy Publishing and later F.P.C.I. (Eshbach bought Crawford his first set of type for his press) and Thomas Hadley, of first The Buffalo Book Company and later Hadley Publishing Company (both of Providence, RI), whom Eshbach instructed and assisted with marketing and sales of his books and organization of his mailing list (which list eventually became the basis for the formation of a sales base for his own Fantasy Press).

His memoirs, Over My Shoulder: Reflections on a Science Fiction Era, were published in 1983; and his last novel, The Scroll of Lucifer, in 1990. Other books included The Armlet of the Gods, The Land Beyond the Gate, The Sorceress of Scath and The Tyrant of Time. He also edited Of Worlds Beyond: The Science of Science Fiction Writing (Reading, PA: Fantasy, 1947), the first book-length work on science fiction writing from a professional point of view.

An active member of science fiction's First Fandom, he was Guest of Honor at the 1949 World Science Fiction Convention and the 1995 World Fantasy Convention.

Hubbard quotation

In his 1982 memoirs, Over My Shoulder: Reflections on a Science Fiction Era, Eshbach quotes L. Ron Hubbard as telling him in 1949, "I'd like to start a religion. That's where the money is."

Further reading 
Davin, Eric Leif. Interview with Eshbach, in Pioneers of Wonder: Conversations With the Founders of Science Fiction. Amherst, NY: Prometheus Books, 1999.

References

Sources

External links

 
 
 

1910 births
2003 deaths
20th-century American novelists
American Christian clergy
American male novelists
20th-century American memoirists
American publishers (people)
American science fiction writers
American speculative fiction editors
American speculative fiction publishers (people)
People from Upper Hanover Township, Pennsylvania
Science fiction editors
Novelists from Pennsylvania
American male short story writers
20th-century American short story writers
20th-century American male writers
American male non-fiction writers
20th-century American clergy